Hu Yuzhi (September 9, 1896 – January 16, 1986) was a Chinese politician who served as a vice chairperson of the Chinese People's Political Consultative Conference and the acting chairman of the China Democratic League.

References 

1896 births
1986 deaths
Chairpersons of the China Democratic League
Vice Chairpersons of the National Committee of the Chinese People's Political Consultative Conference